Keetch is a surname. Notable people with the surname include:

Bobby Keetch (1941–1996), British footballer 
Paul Keetch (1961–2017), British politician and lobbyist
Von G. Keetch (1960–2018), American lawyer and Mormon general authority